Sathyaraj Natarajan is an Indian film editor, who has worked on Tamil language films. He was an assistant to Praveen K. L., and has often collaborated in ventures involving director Sai Gokul and won critical acclaimed films for Vidiyum Munn (2013) and Kalyana Samayal Saadham (2013).

Career
Natarajan worked as an assistant to Praveen K. L. in the production of Aaranya Kaandam (2011), and edited the unreleased horror film Shivani directed by Sai Gokul. He worked simultaneously on two projects, Vidiyum Munn (2013), a thriller, and  Kalyana Samayal Saadham (2013), a romantic comedy; Behindwoods.com presented him the Best Editor Award.

He continued his collaboration with Sai Gokul in Vaaliba Raja (2016) and the Anirudh musical Rum (2017). He worked on Thiagarajan Kumararaja's project, Super Deluxe (2019) starring Vijay Sethupathi and Samantha.
He is the editor for Andhaghaaram, written and directed by V Vignarajan.

Filmography
 Vidiyum Munn (2013)
 Kalyana Samayal Saadham (2013)
 Oru Modhal Oru Kadhal (2014)
 Vaaliba Raja (2016)
 Rum (2017)
 Super Deluxe (2019)
 Andava Kaanom (2020)
 Andhaghaaram (2020)

References

Living people
Tamil film editors
Film editors from Tamil Nadu
Artists from Chennai
Year of birth missing (living people)